The Northern Rockies Regional Municipality (NRRM), formerly the Northern Rockies Regional District (NRRD), and before that the Fort Nelson–Liard Regional District, is a municipality in northeastern British Columbia, Canada. Although portrayed as a regional municipality in its official name, and existing on the same administrative level as a regional district, it is actually classified as a district municipality. The NRRM's offices are located in Fort Nelson, formerly an incorporated town that amalgamated with the NRRD on February 6, 2009 to form the NRRM. With the Peace River Regional District as the southern part, it was the northern part of the Peace River-Liard Regional District, which was split into two on October 31, 1987.

The NRRM lies on the east slope of the Rocky Mountains, and comprises approximately 10% of the total area of the province of British Columbia, encompassing . Its southern boundary is the 58th parallel of latitude and is bisected by the Alaska Highway from its southeast to its northwest. The Northern Rockies Regional Municipality is primarily made up of heavily forested areas and mountainous terrain.

The Northern Rockies Regional Municipality is the first of its kind in British Columbia in which an entire former regional district is governed and headed by a single municipal government. Its council comprises a mayor and six councillors. Bill Streeper was the NRRM's first mayor.

Communities

Fort Nelson

With a 2016 population of 3,366, Fort Nelson is the largest community in the Northern Rockies Regional Municipality. All of the NRRM's offices and officials are based out of Fort Nelson.

Fort Nelson First Nation

Fort Nelson First Nation is an aboriginal band situated directly outside of the town of Fort Nelson and a signatory nation of Treaty 8. The reserve is home to about 700 residents, making Fort Nelson First Nation one of the largest reservations in northern British Columbia. Dene and Cree are the most prevalent Aboriginal Canadian backgrounds found on the Fort Nelson First Nation reserve. The nation works closely with oil and gas producers to ensure safe and sustainable development in the Horn River Basin based on the fact that much of the new development in the Horn River Basin is occurring on traditional Fort Nelson First Nation land. The band operates Echo-Dene and the Liard Hot Springs lodge, as well as Chalo School, a kindergarten to grade twelve accredited educational institution. Liz Logan is the Chief Councillor of the Fort Nelson First Nation, reelected in August 2014. The FNFN Band Council consists of seven councillors, an increase from six. The chosen councillors then decided amongst themselves the Chief Councillor.

Prophet River First Nation

The Prophet River First Nation is the southernmost community in the Northern Rockies Regional Municipality. Prophet River's main industries revolve around commercial services and provisions to the local and nearby oil and gas industry. Lynette Tsakoza is currently the chief of Prophet River First Nation which is a member of the Treaty 8 Tribal Association.

Tetsa River
Tetsa River is a small community based on the Alaska Highway that is known for its eco-tourism and camping. Fishing, rafting, hunting, and other eco-tourism related activities are commonly practiced recreational attractants to the region. Tetsa River offers a popular fishing derby every August, in which residents from all over the region compete.

Toad River

Toad River is the largest regional community north of Fort Nelson in terms of population. The community is home to a highway maintenance camp, a small school accredited by the region's school district (School District 81), a community hall, two campgrounds, and two lodges. Toad River's economy relies primarily on tourism, and is a popular destination for travellers on the Alaska Highway.

Muncho Lake

Muncho Lake is a community that is situated on the Muncho Lake Provincial Park. The park is known for its blue-coloured lake which attracts tourists to the area every year. Muncho Lake is situated on the Alaska Highway.

Demographics 

Ethnicity 

Note: Totals greater than 100% due to multiple origin responses.

Religion 
According to the 2021 census, religious groups in the Northern Rockies Regional Municipality included:
Irreligion (2,300 persons or 59.5%)
Christianity (1,460 persons or 37.8%)
Sikhism (40 persons or 1.0%)
Other (30 persons or 0.8%)

References and notes

External links

 
District municipalities in British Columbia
Fort Nelson Country
Liard Country
Regional districts of British Columbia